The 2011–12 season will be Kaposvári Rákóczi FC's 13th competitive season, 8th consecutive season in the OTP Bank Liga and 88th year in existence as a football club.

First team squad

Transfers

Summer

In:

Out:

Winter

In:

Out:

List of Hungarian football transfer summer 2011
List of Hungarian football transfers winter 2011–12

Statistics

Appearances and goals
Last updated on 27 May 2012.

|-
|colspan="14"|Youth players

|-
|colspan="14"|Players currently out on loan

|-
|colspan="14"|Players no longer at the club

|}

Top scorers
Includes all competitive matches. The list is sorted by shirt number when total goals are equal.

Last updated on 27 May 2012

Disciplinary record
Includes all competitive matches. Players with 1 card or more included only.

Last updated on 27 May 2012

Overall
{|class="wikitable"
|-
|Games played || 44 (30 OTP Bank Liga, 6 Hungarian Cup and 8 Hungarian League Cup)
|-
|Games won || 14 (7 OTP Bank Liga, 3 Hungarian Cup and 4 Hungarian League Cup)
|-
|Games drawn || 18 (14 OTP Bank Liga, 2 Hungarian Cup and 2 Hungarian League Cup)
|-
|Games lost || 12 (9 OTP Bank Liga, 1 Hungarian Cup and 2 Hungarian League Cup)
|-
|Goals scored || 52
|-
|Goals conceded || 51
|-
|Goal difference || +1
|-
|Yellow cards || 91
|-
|Red cards || 9
|-
|rowspan="1"|Worst discipline ||  Gábor Jánvári (9 , 1 )
|-
|rowspan="1"|Best result || 3–0 (H) v Putnoki VSE - Hungarian Cup - 03-12-2011
|-
|rowspan="1"|Worst result || 0–4 (A) v Kecskeméti TE - OTP Bank Liga - 24-07-2011
|-
|rowspan="2"|Most appearances ||  Gábor Jánvári (33 appearances)
|-
|  Benjamin Balázs (33 appearances)
|-
|rowspan="1"|Top scorer ||  Milan Perić (13 goal)
|-
|Points || 60/132 (45.46%)
|-

Nemzeti Bajnokság I

Matches

Classification

Results summary

Results by round

Hungarian Cup

Round of 16

Quarter-final

League Cup

Group stage

Classification

Quarter-final

Pre Season (Winter)

References

External links
 Eufo
 Official Website
 UEFA
 fixtures and results

Hungarian football clubs 2011–12 season
Kaposvári Rákóczi FC seasons